Pimenta cainitoides is a species of plant in the family Myrtaceae. It is endemic to Cuba.  It is threatened by habitat loss.

References

Flora of Cuba
cainitoides
Vulnerable plants
Taxonomy articles created by Polbot